Annapurna IV is a mountain of the Annapurna mountain range in the Himalayas which is located in Nepal. Along with the taller Annapurna II, it is isolated from the other peaks in the range via a major col. It is the 4th highest peak of the range. It was first climbed in 1955 by a German expedition led by Heinz Steinmetz via the North Face and Northwest Ridge. The summit party comprised Steinmetz, Harald Biller, and Jürgen Wellenkamp.

Features

Despite its low prominence, Annapurna IV is an important peak relative to its immediate neighbors. The standard route of ascent for Annapurna II uses the North face of this peak to ascend to the ridge that connects the two summits, thus circumventing many of the hazards faced on that mountain. To the West, Annapurna IV drops away steeply into a major col, from which then rises the famous Southeast ridge of Annapurna III. Although subject to decades of attempts, the ridge was only successfully climbed for the first time in 2021.

Rockfalls

Rockfalls from Annapurna IV are thought to have blocked the Seti River, creating a temporary dam.

See also
 Annapurna II
 Annapurna I Main
 Annapurna I Central
 Annapurna I East
 Annapurna III

References

Seven-thousanders of the Himalayas
Mountains of the Gandaki Province